The Chillicothe Gazette is Ohio's oldest newspaper,  published daily at Chillicothe, Ohio, the seat of Ross County, Ohio, by Gannett. The paper was founded as a weekly at Cincinnati, Ohio, then the capital of the Northwest Territory, November 9, 1793 as the Centinel of the Northwest Territory.  It decamped to Chillicothe when the territorial government moved to that city c. 1800.  The paper was owned until the 1990s by Gannett, who sold it to Community Newspaper Holdings who in turn sold to The Thomson Corporation.  When Thomson exited the newspaper business in the late 1990s, Gannett bought it back.

References

External links

 Chillicothe Gazette official site
 Official mobile website

Newspapers published in Ohio
Chillicothe, Ohio
Gannett publications
1793 establishments in the Northwest Territory